Boss Guitar is an album by American jazz guitarist Wes Montgomery, released in 1963 by Riverside. It was reissued on the Original Jazz Classics label with alternate takes. All the tracks are available on Wes Montgomery: The Complete Riverside Recordings.

Reception 

AllMusic jazz critic Scott Yanow described Boss Guitar as "enjoyable if not essential." David Rickert, for All About Jazz, stated: "Montgomery was always at his best as the sole lead instrument, as this recording will attest."

Track listing
"Besame Mucho" (Consuelo Velázquez, Sunny Skylar) – 6:28  
"Besame Mucho" [Take 2]* (Velazquez, Skylar) – 6:24  
"Dearly Beloved" (Jerome Kern, Johnny Mercer) – 4:49  
"Days of Wine and Roses" (Henry Mancini, Johnny Mercer) – 3:44  
"The Trick Bag" (Wes Montgomery) – 4:25  
"Canadian Sunset" (Eddie Heywood, Norman Gimbel) – 5:04  
"Fried Pies" (Montgomery) – 6:42  
"Fried Pies" [Take 1]* (Montgomery) – 6:35  
"The Breeze and I" (Ernesto Lecuona, Al Stillman) – 4:08  
"For Heaven's Sake" (Elise Bretton, Sherman Edwards, Donald Meyer) – 4:39
(*) Alternate takes not on original LP, included in CD reissue in 1989.

Personnel
 Wes Montgomery – guitar
 Melvin Rhyne – organ
 Jimmy Cobb – drums
Production notes:
 Orrin Keepnews – producer
 Ray Fowler – engineer

References

External links
Jazz Discography

1963 albums
Wes Montgomery albums
Albums produced by Orrin Keepnews
Riverside Records albums